Midwest Transit Racing is a disbanded NASCAR Winston Cup Series team owned and operated by Hal Hicks and Mike Witter. It was formed in 1998 as No. 03 with Dan Pardus driving and Midwest Transit as the sponsor. Before the car hit the track however, NASCAR changed the car number to 07 for unspecified reasons. The team planned to run as many races as possible, but several starts led to nothing but DNQ's until the Pepsi 400, where Pardus finished 36th after a crash. The team tried again in 1999, only switching its car number to 50. When Pardus did not qualify for any of his attempts, he was replaced by Ricky Craven. At first, the combination seemed to work, but in 2000, the team began to fail to qualify for races again as well as having problems finishing races. After Craven quit the team, Rick Mast drove the car briefly, attempting races on a limited schedule, before Rich Bickle took over for one race at Indianapolis. After that the team suspended operations and closed down, ending a brief but tumultuous run in NASCAR.

Car No. 50 results

External links
 

Auto racing teams established in 1998
Auto racing teams disestablished in 2001
Defunct NASCAR teams
American auto racing teams